The 12.7×55mm cartridge is used in some Russian firearms such as VKS bullpup sniper rifle and ShAK-12 bullpup battle rifle and RSh-12 revolver. The cartridge can carry a projectile weighing between from 108 grains and 1173 grains and is predominantly used to fire heavy subsonic loads.

Despite being chambered in the same cartridge, the ShAK-12 (and RSh-12) would not be able to feed or chamber rounds designed for the VKS due to significant length differences in the bullet component of the cartridge and thus requires its own, shorter, loads.

Cartridge variants for use in the VKS
 STs-130 (СЦ-130) - standard
 STs-130U (СЦ-130У) - for training
 STs-130PT (СЦ-130ПТ) - increased accuracy (59 gram bullet)
 STs-130PT2 (СЦ-130ПТ2) - increased accuracy (solid bronze bullet)
 STs-130VPS (СЦ-130ВПС) - increased penetration (76 gram bullet)

Cartridge variants for use in the ShAK-12

 Legkaya Pulya (LP) or "Light Bullet" - Light supersonic sabot-born lead bullet with an aluminum core weighing 7 grams (108 grains).
 Tyazhelaya Pulya (TP) or "Heavy Bullet" - Heavy subsonic lead bullet weighing 33 grams (509 grains).
 Dvukhpul'niy (DP) or "Double-Bulleted" - Two bullets loaded inline weighing 17 grams (262 grains) each.
 Broneboynaya Pulya (BP) or "Armor-Piercing Bullet" - Lead bullet with an armor-piercing component weighing nearly 18 grams (277 grains).

See also
 Thumper concept
 Whisper (cartridge family)
 List of AR platform cartridges
 List of rifle cartridges
 12 mm caliber
 8.6 Blackout
 .375 SOCOM
 .45-70 Government
 .45 Raptor
 .450 Bushmaster
 .458 SOCOM
 .458 Winchester Magnum
 .50 Beowulf
 .50 Alaskan

References 

Pistol and rifle cartridges
Subsonic rifle cartridges